Ciox Health is a healthcare information management company with headquarters in Alpharetta, Georgia. The company provides a variety of services in release of information department (ROI), record retrieval and health information management.

History

Ciox Health was formerly known as HealthPort Incorporated and changed its name to CIOX Health in March 2016. The company was founded in 1976 and is headquartered in Alpharetta, Georgia.

Ciox Health was created by the merger of HealthPort, IOD Inc., Care Communications Inc. and ECS. It serves more than 18,000 provider sites, 140 health plans and 1 million unique requesters of patient information.

In June 2021, Ciox Health was acquired by San Francisco-based Datavant in a $7B deal.

Recent Acquisition
In April 2017 Ciox Health acquired ArroHealth, a provider of chart retrieval and risk adjustment services for health plans and health care provider groups. The Hauppauge, New York-based target offers a variety of services, including: analytics, medical record retrieval, data aggregation, and risk adjustment coding.

References

External links 
 Website

1985 establishments in Georgia (U.S. state)
Health_informatics
2021 mergers and acquisitions
Telemedicine